Mount Burnham is a projecting, bluff-type mountain,  high, along the western wall of the Daniels Range,  south of Big Brother Bluff, in the Usarp Mountains. It was mapped by the U.S. Geological Survey from surveys and from U.S. Navy air photos, 1960–63, and named by the Advisory Committee on Antarctic Names for James B. Burnham, ionospheric physicist who wintered at South Pole Station in 1958 and 1961.

See also
Fikkan Peak

References
 

Mountains of Oates Land